Isabel Macías Chow is a Spanish runner who specializes in the middle distance events.

Competition record

References

Living people
Spanish female middle-distance runners
Sportspeople from Zaragoza
Athletes (track and field) at the 2012 Summer Olympics
Olympic athletes of Spain
Year of birth missing (living people)
21st-century Spanish women